Kilis District is a district of Kilis Province of Turkey. Its seat is the city Kilis. It had a total population of 125,079 in 2022.

References

Districts of Kilis Province